Spalgis jacksoni is a butterfly in the family Lycaenidae. It is found in Uganda and Tanzania.

Subspecies
Spalgis jacksoni jacksoni (western Uganda)
Spalgis jacksoni stempfferi Kielland, 1985 (Tanzania: Kasye and Kefu forests)

References

Butterflies described in 1967
Miletinae